Karnika Seth (born May 31, 1976)  is an Indian lawyer, writer, educator, and policymaker. She specializes in cyber law, intellectual property law, media law, and the protection of women and children. She is one of the co-founders of the law firm Seth Associates and manages its Corporate & Cyber laws practice.

Work contribution 

Seth is a proponent of net neutrality on the internet and advocates the principles of openness, fairness, and equal access to the internet. She spearheads the mission of promoting online safety, particularly among women and children, and is the author of the guidebook Protection of children on Internet. She was consulted by UNICEF on laws combatting child online abuse to bring out a useful guidebook Child online protection in India in 2016  & other forums. She has actively voiced the need for India to sign a Cybercrime convention and strengthen its law enforcement to combat cybercrimes .She is empanelled advisor to the office of Controller of Certifying Authorities, Ministry of Information Technology, Government of India and National Internet Exchange Of India.

Educator 
As an educator, She actively trains law enforcement on Cyber laws & Electronic Evidence and is the Visiting Faculty to the National Judicial Academy, Bhopal the National Police Academy, Hyderabad, Central Bureau of Investigations and the National Investigation Authority  and other bodies.

Publications 
She authored a comprehensive reference book titled Computers, Internet & New Technology Laws, published by Lexis Nexis in 2012 that elucidates the recent developments in cyber law across India, United States and Europe. Her book, Protection of Children on Internet, released in 2015 is one of the most significant contributions to child safety on the Internet. She writes extensively on protecting children from bullying, trolling and other crimes.

Writer 
She writes extensively on key cyber law issues for legal Journals and newspapers, and regularly speaks at national and International forums on significant issues impacting the cyberworld.

As a policymaker, she  participates in Working Group Discussions in ICANN discussion forums that makes policies to strengthen next generation internet. and actively associates with activities of International Telecommunication Unions, IETE, ITU APT, Data Security Council of India, ICMEC, UNICEF, and other international and national bodies.

Her views on reforming Cyber laws in India have been solicited by the Indian Parliament and Ministry of Information Technology in India and the e-committee of the Supreme Court of India. She regularly contributes her views on strengthening cyber laws in India through print, electronic media   and television.

Awards and honors 
Karnika Seth was conferred with the Law Day Award in 2012 from the chief Justice of India. Seth again received the Law Day Award on the occasion of Law Day In 2015. She is the recipient of the Digital Empowerment Award for the year 2015 conferred by the Broadband India Forum and Ministry of Information Technology, India  
She was recently conferred the title of Honorary professor by Amity University on International Women's day in 2017.

References 

1976 births
Living people
21st-century Indian lawyers
21st-century Indian women lawyers
Indian legal writers